Major and Majors are surnames. Notable people with the surnames include:

 Bobby Majors (born 1949), American football player
 Brenda Major (born 1950), American psychologist
 Clarence Major (born 1936), American poet
 Dan T. Major (born 1973), Israeli chemistry professor
 Edward Major (1615–ca. 1655), Virginia colonial politician
 Fali Homi Major (born 1947), Indian air marshal
 George D. Major (1819-1902), American politician, businessman and agriculturist
 Gerri Major (1894–1984), African-American journalist and community leader
 John Major (born 1943), former Prime Minister of the United Kingdom
 John C. Major (born 1931), Canadian jurist
 John Clarkson Major (1826–1895), English manufacturing chemist and tar distiller, mayor of Wolverhampton 1875–76
 Johnny Majors (born 1935), American football player and coach
 Jonathan Majors (born 1989), American actor
 Kerrick Majors (died 1987), African-American murder victim
 Lee Majors (born 1939), American actor
 Léo Major (1921–2008), Canadian Army corporal
 Les Major (1926–2001), English footballer
 Mark Major (born 1970), Canadian ice hockey player
 Rod Majors, stage name of Matt Sanchez (born 1970), American journalist
 Scott Major (born 1975), Australian actor and director
 Shirley Majors (1914–1981), American football coach, father of Johnny Majors
 Thomas Major (1720–1799), English engraver
 William James Major (1881–1953), Canadian politician and jurist
 William T. Major (1790–1867), American pastor

See also
 Major (disambiguation), which includes fictional characters
 Major (given name)

English-language surnames